Johnny Hansen (born 25 July 1965) is a Danish singer and musician, most famous as vocalist and guitarist of dansband Kandis. In addition to his career in Kandis, he has also released his own materials including four albums.

In 1983, at age 18, he joined the band Airport that split up in 1988. With Jens Erik Jensen, a fellow musician, he formed the duo Jens Erik and Torben. With bassist Jørgen Hein Jørgensen joining later, the duo became a band renamed as Kandis.

He also took part in 2001 in Dansk Melodi Grand Prix with the song "Lidt efter lidt" in a bid to represent Denmark in Eurovision Song Contest 2001. It was co-written by him and Nanna Kalinka Bjerke. His song did not qualify in selection round of ten songs.

Personal life
Johnny Hansen is the son of Bjørn Hansen of Bjørn & Okay fame. He has two daughters, Cecilie and Caroline from the late Helle Bekhøj. The family resides in Hurup Thy, a locality in the municipality of Thisted in northwestern Jutland, Denmark.

Discography

Albums

Singles

References

Danish male singers
Danish guitarists
1965 births
Living people
People from Thisted Municipality